NCN may be refer to:

Media
Napoca Cable Network, a local television from Cluj-Napoca, Romania
National Christian Network, a satellite TV network
NCN Television, a Puerto Rican television station later broadcasting under the call sign WUJI
New China News, a news agency of the People's Republic of China more commonly referred to as Xinhua
New Country Network, a Canadian country music television station later renamed as CMT
News Channel Nebraska, network of commercial radio and television stations in the U.S. state of Nebraska

Other
Chenega Bay Airport (IATA: NCN), an airport in Chenega, Alaska
Nathan Coulter-Nile, Australian cricketer
National Caricaturist Network, a cartoonists' trade association
National Cycle Network, a network of cycle routes in the United Kingdom
The National Science Centre (Poland), a state-funded science funder in Poland (Narodowe Centrum Nauki)
Nisichawayasihk Cree Nation, a Cree community location in and around Manitoba, Canada